Timestalker is an upcoming British historical sci-fi rom-com film written, directed by, and starring Alice Lowe.

Synopsis
Agnes falls in love with the wrong man and then gets reincarnated and falls in love with him over and over again, travelling through 1680s Western Scotland, Rural England in the 1790s, and 1980s Manhattan, and then an apocalyptic 22nd Century.

Cast
Alice Lowe as Agnes
Jacob Anderson as Scipio
Nick Frost
Tanya Reynolds as Meg
Aneurin Barnard
Kate Dickie
Dan Skinner
Mike Wozniak

Production
In February 2021 it was announced that Lowe’s new project was called Timestalker and was a romantic comedy about one woman’s unrequited love across centuries from 1680s Western Scotland through to an apocalyptic 22nd century. It had Sam Riley, Jacob Anderson and Natasia Demetriou attached to it with Lowe herself also acting. Vaughan Sivell was announced as producing for Western Edge Pictures and HanWay handling international sales. In October 2022 it was announced that filming had commenced with Nick Frost, Tanya Reynolds, Aneurin Barnard, Kate Dickie, Dan Skinner, and Mike Wozniak in the cast and Riley and Demetriou no longer involved. Popcorn Group were on board as co-producers with funding coming from the BFI, Head Gear Films, and Ffilm Cymru Wales with funding from the National Lottery and the Welsh Government via Creative Wales. HanWay Films released first look images of Frost and Lowe in historical costume in February 2023.

Release
The Timestalker production is working towards a 2023 release.

External links

References

Upcoming films
2020s English-language films
Films shot in Wales
British romantic comedy films
British science fiction films
British post-apocalyptic films
21st-century dystopian films
2020s dystopian films